Ioannis Vroutsis (1 June 1963, Athens) is a Greek economist, lawyer and politician, serving as the New Democracy MP for Cyclades and serving as a parliamentary spokesman for New Democracy since 5 January 2021, having previously served as Minister of Labour, Social Security and Welfare in 21 June 2012 - 27 January 2015 and 9 July 2019 - 5 January 2021.

Early life and education 
Vroutsis was born in Athens on 1 June 1963 and is originally from Naxos and Amorgos. He studied economics at the School of Law, Economics and Political Sciences of the National and Kapodistrian University of Athens, where he was awarded a scholarship. He also holds a master's degree from Panteion University. He has previously worked as an economist at the Ministry of Finance.

Political career 
He began to participate in politics as a member of the ND Youth. He has twice been a member of the Executive Committee as Secretary of the MAKI and as the Head of Basin organizations.

He had an active and long-standing involvement in local government. He served as a municipal councilor in Vyronas in 1990.

He was first elected Member of Parliament for the Cyclades in 2007, and was re-elected in 2009, 2012 and 2015.

First term as Minister of Labor 
He served as New Democracy's Chief Policy Officer from 2009 to 2011, when he was appointed ND's chief financial officer under Antonis Samaras. On 21 June 2012, he took up the post of Minister of Labour, Social Security and Welfare in the coalition government of Antonis Samaras.

In Opposition 
Following the 2015 national elections, on 5 February 2015, by decision of the party president, he is appointed along with Kyriakos Mitsotakis and Adonis Georgiadis as a party parliamentary spokesman.

On 13 January 2016, by the decision of the new party president Kyriakos Mitsotakis, he was re-appointed as parliamentary spokesman of New Democracy alongside Nikos Dendias and Niki Kerameus.

Second term as Minister of Labor 
Following the 2019 election and the formation of a Mitsotakis government, Ioannis Vroutsis was appointed Minister of Labor and Social Affairs.

His first act as Minister of Labor was to remove the ability to apply for a social security number from foreigners residing in Greece.

In April 2020, during the initial outbreak of the COVID-19 pandemic, he announced a voucher program for scientists (lawyers, engineers/architects, educators and others) where they would complete a basic computer training program in exchange for a 600 euro voucher.
The implementation of the program was plagued by various technical difficulties and the content was characterized by the opposition as low quality, consisting of scanned and poorly translated pages of books. The program was eventually pulled and vouchers were given out without conditions.

He was replaced by Kostis Hatzidakis during the January 5th 2021 cabinet reshuffle.

Member of Parliament (2019-)

After leaving the Mitsotakis cabinet in January 2021, he was once again placed in the position of Parliamentary spokesperson.

In March 2021, he stated in an interview to the Documento newspaper that TV personality Menios Fourthiotis had entered his ministry office with his private security team and threatened him over his attempt to stop a fraud case involving himself.

References 

Living people
1963 births
Panteion University alumni
20th-century Greek economists
Government ministers of Greece
National and Kapodistrian University of Athens alumni
Politicians from Athens
Greek MPs 2019–2023
21st-century Greek economists